Geir Einang (born March 8, 1965 in Årdal, Sogn og Fjordane) is a former Norwegian biathlete. 
He participated in the Norwegian team that received bronze medals in the 4 × 7.5 km relay in the Biathlon World Championships in Feistritz an der Drau in 1989, and in Lahti in 1991.

References

Living people
Biathletes at the 1988 Winter Olympics
Biathletes at the 1992 Winter Olympics
Olympic biathletes of Norway
Norwegian male biathletes
1965 births
Biathlon World Championships medalists
People from Årdal
Sportspeople from Vestland